Parochthiphila is a genus of flies belonging to the family Chamaemyiidae.

The species of this genus are found in Europe and Africa.

Species:
 Parochthiphila aethiopica Hennig, 1938 
 Parochthiphila argentiseta Ebejer & Raspi, 2008

References

Chamaemyiidae
Brachycera genera